The 1980 Northwestern Wildcats team was an American football team that represented Northwestern University during the 1980 Big Ten Conference football season. In their third year under head coach Rick Venturi, the Wildcats finished in last place in the Big Ten Conference (Big Ten), compiled a 0–11 record (0–9 against Big Ten opponents), and were outscored by their opponents by a combined total of 444 to 151.  The team played its home games at Dyche Stadium in Evanston, Illinois.

Northwestern finished the season in the midst of a 34-game losing streak, the longest in NCAA Division I-A history. The streak began on September 22, 1979, and ended on September 25, 1982.

The team's statistical leaders included quarterback Mike Kerrigan with 1,816 passing yards, Jeff Cohn with 503 rushing yards, Todd Sheets with 570 receiving yards, and placekicker Jay Anderson with 37 points scored. Several Northwestern players also ranked among the Big Ten leaders in various statistical categories, including the following:
 Mike Kerrigan led the Big Ten with 17 interceptions and ranked third with 173 pass completions and 337 pass attempts and fourth with 1,816 passing yards and 1,789 total yards. 
 Lou Tiberi led the conference with 18 kickoff returns and ranked second with 402 kickoff return yards and fourth with 22.3 yards per kickoff return.
 Todd Sheets ranked fifth with 17.3 yards per reception and eighth with 570 receiving yards.

Schedule

Game summaries

at Illinois 
On September 6, in the first conference game of the season, Illinois defeated Northwestern, 35–9, at Memorial Stadium in Champaign, Illinois. It was Illinois' first game under new head coach Mike White and its first victory at Memorial Stadium since October 1977.

at Michigan
On September 13, Michigan (AP No. 11) defeated Northwestern, 17–10, at Michigan Stadium. Playing in a steady rain, the Wolverines struggled. Anthony Carter had a 17-yard touchdown reception to give Michigan the win.

at Washington
On September 20, Northwestern lost to Washington (AP No. 16), 45–7, in Seattle. Washington's Toussaint Tyler rushed for 83 yards and scored three touchdowns.

at Syracuse
On September 27, Northwestern lost to Syracuse, 42–21, before a crowd of 34,738 at the Carrier Dome in Syracuse. Northwestern quarterback Mike Kerrigan set a single-game Northwestern record with 25 completions, passing for 269 yards and three touchdowns. Joe Morris rushed for 172 yards for Syracuse. The game was marred by oranges being repeatedly thrown on the field by students, resulting in two 15-yard penalties and caused Syracuse's quarterback to slip on a peel at the Northwestern one-yard line. Syracuse coach Frank Maloney called the students' conduct both "sinful" and "bush league".

Minnesota
On October 4, Northwestern lost to Minnesota, 49–21, at Dyche Stadium.  Minnesota was led by running backs Marion Barber, Jr. (118 rushing yards, three touchdowns) and Garry White (129 rushing yards, two touchdowns).

Ohio State
On October 11, Ohio State defeated Northwestern, 63–0, before a homecoming crowd of 29,375 at Dyche Stadium in Evanston. Ohio State led, 42–0, at halftime. Ohio State had 575 total yards, including 418 rushing yards. Calvin Murray had 120 yards and three touchdowns on nine carries. The night before the game, Northwestern coach was served with a lawsuit filed by 22 African American players alleging racial discrimination.

at Iowa
On October 18, Iowa defeated Northwestern, 25–3, before a homecoming crowd of 59,990 in Iowa City. In his first game as Iowa's starting tailback, Phil Blatcher rushed for 148 yards on 19 carries, including a 51-yard gain on a Statue of Liberty play, and also caught a touchdown pass.

Indiana
On October 25, Indiana defeated Northwestern, 35–20, in Evanston. Indina's Lonnie Johnson rushed for 160 yards on 22 carries, and Mike Harkrader added 102 rushing yards.

Purdue
On November 1, Purdue (AP No. 20) defeated Northwestern, 52–31, before a crowd of 17,744 persons at Dyche Stadium in Evanston. Purdue's 52 points was its highest scoring output in a game since 1947. Purdue running back rushed for 190 yards and scored four touchdown. Mark Herrmann passed for 210 yards and three touchdowns. Hermann also set the all-time record for career pass completions (651) and interceptions (69).

at Michigan State
On November 8, Michigan State defeated Northwestern, 42–10, before a crowd of 60,157 at Spartan Stadium in East Lansing. Michigan State tailback Steve Smith rushed for 229 yards and a school record with four touchdowns. The Spartans totaled 571 yards of total offense.

Wisconsin
On November 15, Wisconsin defeated Northwestern, 39–19, in Evanston. Northwestern's Mike Kerrigan passed for 237 yards in the loss.

Roster

References

Northwestern
Northwestern Wildcats football seasons
College football winless seasons
Northwestern Wildcats football